Cabestany is a commune in the Pyrénées-Orientales department in southern France.

Geography

Localisation 
Cabestany is located in the canton of Perpignan-3 and in the arrondissement of Perpignan.

Government and politics

Mayors

Population

Notable people 
The Master of Cabestany was from this area, and there is a museum dedicated to his work in the town.

See also

Communes of the Pyrénées-Orientales department

References

Communes of Pyrénées-Orientales